La Liberté was a French Legitimist newspaper created in July 1865 by Charles-François-Xavier Müller and sold in 1866 to Émile de Girardin. Its last issue was published in 1940.

Editors 
 1866-1870 : Émile de Girardin ;
 1870-1876 : Léonce Détroyat ;
 1876-1889 : Louis Gal ;
 1893-1898 : Jules Franck ;
 1898-1911 : Georges Berthoulat ;
 1922-1933 : Camille Aymard ;
 1934-1936 : Désiré Ferry ;
 1937-1940 : Jacques Doriot.

References

1865 establishments in France
1870 disestablishments in France
Defunct newspapers published in France
Publications established in 1865
Publications disestablished in 1870